Eddie Harris Goes to the Movies is the fifth album by American jazz saxophonist Eddie Harris. Recorded in 1962 and released on the Vee-Jay label the album features Harris performing orchestral arrangements of many motion picture themes of the era.

Reception
The Allmusic review states "With the wine-and-candlelight string backdrops of Dick Marx throwing velvet drapery in back of a lush tenor sax, this LP oozes the mood-music formula so favored by pop record producers in mid-century America... A period piece, but seductive if you're in the mood".

Track listing
 "Laura" (Johnny Mercer, David Raksin) - 3:08 
 "Be My Love" (Nicholas Brodszky, Sammy Cahn) - 2:16 
 "Gone With the Wind" (Herb Magidson, Allie Wrubel) - 2:34 
 "Secret Love" (Sammy Fain, Paul Francis Webster) - 2:13 
 "These Foolish Things" (Harry Link, Holt Marvell, Jack Strachey) - 3:02 
 "Tonight" (Leonard Bernstein, Stephen Sondheim) - 2:18 
 "The More I See You" (Mack Gordon, Harry Warren) - 3:31 
 "Green Dolphin Street" (Bronisław Kaper, Ned Washington) - 2:32 
 "Guess I'll Hang My Tears Out to Dry" (Cahn, Jule Styne) - 2:50 
 "Moonglow" (Eddie DeLange, Will Hudson, Irving Mills) - 2:47

Personnel
Eddie Harris - tenor saxophone
Unnamed Orchestra conducted by Dick Marx

References 

Eddie Harris albums
1962 albums
Vee-Jay Records albums